On November 6, 2012, the District of Columbia held an election for its non-voting House delegate representing the District of Columbia's at-large congressional district. The election coincided with the elections of other federal offices, including a quadrennial presidential election.

The non-voting delegate is elected for two-year terms.  Democrat Eleanor Holmes Norton, who has represented the district since 1991, ran for re-election.  She ran unopposed in the Democratic primary, held on April 3, 2012.

General election

Candidates
 Eleanor Holmes Norton (Democratic), incumbent Delegate
 Bruce Majors (Libertarian), real estate agent
 Natale Lino Stracuzzi (D.C. Statehood Green)

Results

See also
 United States House of Representatives elections in the District of Columbia

References

External links
 District of Columbia Board of Elections
 Campaign contributions at OpenSecrets
 Outside spending at the Sunlight Foundation
Official campaign websites
 Eleanor Holmes Norton campaign website
 Bruce Majors campaign website

District of Columbia

2012
United States House of Representatives